"Toca's Miracle" is a release by German vocal trance group Fragma featuring vocals from British singer Coco (also known as Coco Star). Taken as the second single off Fragma's debut studio album, Toca (2001), the song is a mashup of Coco's "I Need a Miracle" (1996) and Fragma's own "Toca Me". The instrumental ("Toca Me") was written by Dirk Duderstadt, Marco Duderstadt, Ramon Zenker and the lyrics (of "I Need a Miracle") were written by Rob Davis and Victor Imbres, while the original music was produced by Zenker and the Duderstadts; the vocals were produced 3 years earlier by Imbres and Tim Orford.

The song was critically acclaimed worldwide, with many critics citing the song one of the best dance anthems of all time, praising its catchy tune. The recording was also a commercial success, remaining both Coco's and Fragma's best selling single to date. The recording topped the UK Singles Chart in April 2000 and peaked inside the top ten in countries including Australia, Denmark, Ireland, Italy, and Norway. A music video was issued, depicting Coco Star at a game of futsal. 

The single was re-issued in 2008 by Tiger Records with new remixes. It received mixed reviews from music critics but gained commercial success around the world. A new music video was issued for this version but does not feature Coco, which was a decision from Positiva Records. Tiger Records once again re-released the song in 2012.

Background and recording
In 1999 British DJ Vimto had the idea of taking the 1995 sound recording of Coco's a cappella vocals from the song "I Need a Miracle" and mixing it with the music of Fragma's "Toca Me". By amalgamating the titles, it became "Toca's Miracle". He pressed an illegal bootleg which earned considerable attention from leading DJs. At the time, Fragma were signed to Positiva Records, so a release was made. "I Need a Miracle" was originally released by Greenlight Recordings in 1996 and re-recorded for EMI/Positiva in 1997. It is noted that Coco was never a member of Fragma.

Fragma's producer Ramon Zenker was asked by Positiva Records to mix "Toca Me" with the vocals of "I Need A Miracle" in a proper way for a single-release.

While mixing both recordings, he stated he couldn't believe how the music of "Toca Me" and the vocals of "I Need A Miracle" fit together. "I thought these two songs waited for each other". "Fortunately, this Coco single was on Positiva, which is the same label we are on, That was very good, so Kevin from Positiva A&R sorted things out with Coco and her management, and it was very quick to find a deal to use the vocals. 'I Need A Miracle' was three years old — a long time ago — and 'Toca's Miracle' was more successful than both knocked together, so there was benefit for both sides."

Legal dispute
In late 2012, Coco Star revealed on her official Facebook page that the record label Positiva Records had confused the vocal recordings and sampled the original 1996 version of "I Need a Miracle" (released on Greenlight Records), instead of the 1997 re-recording (released on Positiva). She also wrote in the statement that the agreements that were entered "are now known to be 'Unauthorised'". According to Star, she has never been paid for her vocal contribution to "Toca's Miracle" despite it selling over 3 million copies worldwide. She also claims that she didn't receive any airplay royalties from PPL until 2016.

On Coco Star's SoundCloud page she wrote that the 2008 InPetto remix of "Toca's Miracle", produced by Dirk and Marco Duderstadt (the original writers of "Toca Me") as well as other remixes, were never authorised either.

Shortly after, Kirsty Hawkshaw revealed that Fragma had never paid her royalties for her contribution to the 2006 single "Radio Waves". According to Harkshaw, a recording contract was never signed. Kirsty Hawkshaw and Coco Star have both sued Tiger Records Germany in 2015. Toca's Miracle was subsequently removed from all stores and streaming services globally. 

In 2022, after 8 years, the German court where Coco Star sued Tiger Records and Kontor Records decided that the agreements between Coco Star / Green Light Recordings and the agreements between Positiva Records and Tiger Records (former Gang Go Music) were all the time legal and correct. Tiger Records paid all the time royalties to Positiva/EMI for using the vocal recordings of "I Need A Miracle". All claims from Coco Star were rejected.

Re-releases
In 2007, "I Need A Miracle" was covered by Danish production team KLM Music featuring re-recorded vocals by Coco Star. The cover version was released as "I Need A Miracle".

In 2008, it was announced that a re-release of "Toca's Miracle" would be released under the name "Toca's Miracle 2008". The production of one of the remixes is similar to the original version, but features a more "retro-rave" edit, with the song being remixed by InPetto. The song's composition was described as "subdued, electro-tinged sound, which betrays a marked deep house influence, 'Toca's Miracle 2008' veers perilously close to sounding classy." The song was eventually re-released in Australia as a CD single by Tinted Records, while it was released in Europe around Spring 2008 by Tiger Records and Spinnin' Records with new artwork. Other remixes by Wideboys, Richard Durand and Wes Clarke.

In 2012, the song was re-released as "Toca's Miracle (2012 Update)". The song was issued on a compilation series which was issued by Ministry of Sound.

In April 2022, 22 years after its original release, "Toca's Miracle" by Fragma was re-released digitally following the release of a new vocal version recorded by Tess. This version also features on the new 20th anniversary edition of Fragma's debut album Toca.

On 1 July 2022, Coco Star released a new version of "Toca's Miracle" on Spinnin' Records. The release is credited solely to Coco Star, but is musically similar to the 2000 Fragma version.

Critical reception
"Toca's Miracle" received critical acclaim. DJ Ron Slomowicz from About.com said ""Toca's Miracle" became one of those dance (and even club) standards - reaching the same pinnacle as Darude's "Sandstorm", which is considered the "gold-standard" of music production and Cher's "Believe". Another review from the publication compared the work to Canadian DJ Deadmau5, saying " The In Petto remix of "Toca's Miracle" so eerily resembled Deadmau5 that online leaks mistakenly credited it to him [...]" With the same publication, the song was a runner-up for being the Best Remix/Re-release of 2008. Dancingastronaugh.net called it "one of the more classic progressive tunes of our time."

Nick Levine from Digital Spy gave it a fairly mixed review, only awarding it two stars out of five. He called it "modest beginnings", but believed that the original version was better, saying "[the original] remained pretty much inescapable for the rest of the year, especially for those who frequented provincial nightclubs and/or cultivated a fondness for freeview video channels." He later concluded by saying that "Toca's Miracle" presented more "class", but criticized the use of "class" in a "Euro club banger."

Commercial performances

"Toca Me" and "I Need a Miracle" performances
"Toca Me" entered the top twenty on the UK Singles Chart, where it peaked at number 11. The song also entered inside the top twenty on the Irish Singles Chart, peaking at twenty as well. The song, however did not pursue the same success on the Dutch Top 100, peaking at number forty-nine.

Coco Star's song, "I Need a Miracle", entered the UK singles chart at number 39 in addition to number one on the UK DJ and Club charts in October 1997

Original edit
The song was additionally a commercial success when it was first released. The mash-up debuted at number twenty on the Australian Singles Chart and eventually peaked at number eight for three non-consecutive weeks. The mash-up spanned the charts for eighteen weeks. The mash-up entered at number sixteen on the Norwegian Singles Chart and peaked at number two for a sole week. The mash-up only spent one week on the Italian Singles Chart, peaking at number nineteen. The track entered at eleven on the Spanish Singles Chart, where it ultimately peaked. The track re-entered on 10 May 2009 after its re-release.

The mash-up generated generally moderate success around Europe. Toca's Miracle peaked inside the top forty in Finland, Sweden, Belgium and managed to chart in countries including Switzerland, France and the Netherlands. The track debuted at number ninety-nine on the US Billboard Hot 100 in the United States.

In Coco's native United Kingdom, the mash-up peaked at number one on the UK Singles Chart. The track entered with over 185,000 copies sold in its first week, becoming the highest-charting single that month and was certified platinum by the British Phonographic Industry (BPI) in 2013. As of August 2000, the track alone has sold over 500,000 copies in the United Kingdom.

2008 InPetto remix
The 2008 edit received generally good commercial success. The song reached number two in Spain, a better position than the original version. The song also peaked inside the top ten in Sweden at seven, and eighteen in The Netherlands. The song peaked at ten on the New Zealand Airplay Charts and inside the top twenty on the Australian Dance Singles Chart.

To date, with the re-release, the song has reportedly sold over 3 million copies worldwide.

"I Need a Miracle" (later versions)
After several mixes were released worldwide, some versions have been lucky to chart on record charts around the globe. In Austria, a 2012 update version of Coco's original (known as the "Guru Project Remix") debuted at number sixty for a sole week until falling out. Piror, in Belgium, a Dimitri Vegas & Like Mike Remix of Coco's 2009 version of "I Need a Miracle" was issued at charted at number thirty-seven on the Belgium Singles Chart and stayed in there for four weeks in total. It peaked at three on the Belgium Dance Charts. These recordings an entirely different sound recording of "I Need a Miracle" and are not to be confused with "Toca's Miracle".

Music videos
"Toca Me" 1999 Fragma original video, which is filmed in Ibiza, features British-Spanish vocalist songwriter and dancer Mizz Martinez, formerly known as Eva Martinez.

The original video for "Toca's Miracle" which was broadcast in 2000, features a futsal team of girls, including original singer Coco. Another team enter the locker rooms, where they look intimidating towards the other team. Both teams head towards the court and toss a coin, where Coco's team kicks-off first. The opposition take a 2-0 lead, and begin to become more aggressive or competitive towards the game, obstructing the other team. At the end of the video, it shows Coco's team make a comeback to win the game 3-2.

The 2008 video is completely different from the 2000 video and is the only video not to feature vocalist Coco (then going by the name Coco Star). The video starts with a woman in a room, lip-syncing the song, then begins to strip her clothes off and tries to kiss a man. The next shot features another woman in her bra and underwear, dancing in a supposed bathroom, with another man in the room. Another scene then shows, yet another woman on her bed, where she also has her bra and underwear. She too also lip-syncs to the song playing and starts to seduce a man, laying near the bed. The video ends with one of the woman's eye closes.

Track listing
 UK 2000 CD single
 "Toca's Miracle (Radio Edit) Vocals by Coco"
 "Toca's Miracle (Club Mix) Vocals by Coco"
 "Everybody Knows"

 Australian 2008 CD single
 "Toca's Miracle (Inpetto Edit) Vocals by Coco"
 "Toca's Miracle (Richard Durand Remix Edit) Vocals by Coco"
 "Toca Me (Inpetto 2008 Edit)"
 "Toca's Miracle (Inpetto Remix) Vocals by Coco"
 "Toca's Miracle (Richard Durand Remix) Vocals by Coco"
 "Toca Me (Inpetto 2008 Remix)"

Charts

"Toca Me"

"Toca's Miracle"

Weekly charts

Year-end charts

"Toca's Miracle 2008"

Weekly charts

Year-end charts

"I Need a Miracle" (re-vocal)

Certifications

Release history

Notes

References

External links
  The Guardian discusses Illegitimate Fragma releases.
  Sound on Sound: Fragma's Ramon Zenker discusses the creation of "Toca's Miracle".

1996 songs
1999 singles
2000 singles
Atlantic Records singles
Eurodance songs
Mashup songs
Number-one singles in Scotland
Positiva Records singles
Songs written by Ramon Zenker
Songs written by Rob Davis (musician)
Strictly Rhythm singles
UK Singles Chart number-one singles